Toonturama is an American children's programming block that airs on the Spanish-language television network UniMás (formerly known as Telefutura Network) which debuted on January 15, 2002 ("Mi Tele") and January 19, 2002 ("Toonturama" and "Toonturama Junior"). The four-hour block—which airs Saturday and Sunday mornings from 7:00 a.m. to 11:00 a.m. Eastern Time and Pacific Time—features live action and animated series aimed at children between the ages of 2 and 14. It was the network's attempt to have a Saturday morning block.

Programs featured on the block consist of a mixture of series originally produced in Spanish and dubbed versions of series that were originally produced and broadcast in English. All shows featured on Toonturama are designed to meet federally mandated educational programming guidelines defined by the Federal Communications Commission (FCC) via the Children's Television Act.

History

Mi Tele
On December 15, 2001, UniMás (then known as Telefutura) plans to announced that it would debuted three children's programming blocks with the new weekday and Saturday and Sunday morning cartoon blocks was premiered on January 15 ("Mi Tele"), and January 19, 2002 ("Toonturama" and "Toonturama Junior"), one day after the network was launched on January 14. Featuring live-action and animated series aimed at children between the ages of 2 and 14. It was plans to launch a new block, as part of the programming consisting four to eight shows for 30-minute episodes and aimed at marking the first time that exclusively animated cartoons for different youth audiences.

The first children's block, "Mi Tele" ("My TV"), a two-hour animation block on weekday mornings featuring a mix of imported Spanish-language cartoons such as Fantaghiro and El Nuevo Mundo de los Gnomos ("The New World of the Gnomes"), as well as the originally produced in English as the Zodiac Entertainment cartoon series, Mr. Bogus and the Nelvana cartoon series, Anatole debuted on January 15, 2002. Later on March 15, 2002, the Mi Tele originally cartoon block were ended. The following week on Monday, the featuring with the youth-targeted children's telenovelas (Carrusel, Luz Clarita, Gotita de Amor and Rayito de Luz) airs on the block beginning on March 18, 2002, as part of the update scheduled programming.

Though the block was intended to air on weekday morning on the holidays some of the years. However, some of the youth-targeted novelas aired on Mi Tele block weekday morning or Toonturama weekend morning cartoon block will delayed in order next week and full schedule on Sunday due to the network will picking line-up with all of the holidays and family movies marathon with the attempt of animated movies by Warner Bros. Telefutura Network has distribution and acquired the rights to air on the Warner Bros. animated series within movies by Warner Bros. Animation, DC Comics and Hanna-Barbera such as Scooby-Doo ("Scooby-Doo on Zombie Island" and "Scooby-Doo! and the Witch's Ghost"), Looney Tunes ("The Bugs Bunny/Road Runner Movie"), Tom and Jerry ("Tom and Jerry: The Movie"), The Jetsons ("Jetsons: The Movie") and Batman: The Animated Series ("Batman: Mask of the Phantasm").

On December 24, 2002, Telefutura Network acquired the rights to the popular Warner Bros. Animation television cartoon series, Animaniacs, and it was partly for this reason why some of Telefutura's most popular programs (most notably Animaniacs) were mainly not included as part of the "Mi Tele" or "Toonturama" block, especially during the more open-formatted cartoon block era. However, the network was added in the feature-length direct-to-video movie as the Spanish-dubbed language including Animaniacs: Wakko's Wish was aired on the holiday movie briefly in December 24, 2002, to September 5, 2005.

On August 7, 2007, Mi Tele  ended its run, its last program being Mujeres Engañadas were discontinued. Telefutura kept some of the programming on the second children's cartoon block Toonturama until September 30, 2012.

Toonturama
On January 19, 2002, Telefutura Network (now UniMás) is a two separate known as occupied by the children's programming blocks named, "Toonturama" and "Toonturama Junior" were launched. – It was first four hours of the secondary weekend schedule which features some programs compliant with Federal Communications Commission and educational programming requirements – on the airs for four-hours each Saturday and Sunday mornings at 7:00 a.m. to 11:00 a.m. Eastern and Pacific Time, the other remaining weekend time periods are filled with Informercials. The introduced a new logo with font text (Rat Fink Heavy) with different colors (red and black with the extruded font, and white text for "Toonturama") alongside bumpers and promos with the CGI computer-animated and controlled by TelevisaUnivision USA (formerly Univision Communications; same as the block was launched as "Planeta U" on September 15, 2001, which is designer along with the 3D computer-animated with bumpers and promos on Univision), where was tasked with overhauling Univision, Telefutura and Galavisión's Saturday and Sunday morning lineup in order to compete against the arch-rival network, Telemundo weekend children's block, "Telemundo Kids".

The block included a four-hour lineup that consisted mainly of dubbed versions of American, Canadian, and European animated series came the network opted to fully program the block with shows acquired from various programming production companies and distributors. After the network premiered on January 14, 2002, in the next day, Telefutura entered into a programming three-year agreement with the Canada-based animated studio Nelvana (owned by Corus Entertainment) to program the "Mi Tele" and "Toonturama" block for the first US network deal with the Spanish-dubbed aired on the block has originally produced in English including Anatole, Ned's Newt, Stickin' Around, Cadillacs and Dinosaurs, Mythic Warriors, Tales from the Cryptkeeper and The Dumb Bunnies, as well as the Japanese anime series (such as Lost Universe, Tenchi Universe, and Red Baron) as part of its inaugural lineup.

Cadillacs and Dinosaurs and Tales from the Cryptkeeper, was the only exception that two cartoons series are previously aired with the original English predecessor premiered on September 18, 1993, from the both networks, CBS and ABC's children block on Saturday morning cartoons. On February 8, 2002, Telefutura began discussions and partnership with the Madrid-based animation studio BRB Internacional to have the company program a daily two-hour children's block for the network, segment line-up scheduled from the series featured in the block produced in Spain (such as "Super Models" and "Yolanda: Daughter of the Black Corsair"). Later in 11 days, Telefutura will be including the changing time zone on the program scheduled from 6:30 a.m. to 10:00 a.m. Eastern/Pacific Time Zone in update, including the three former Mi Tele  cartoon shows were moved to Toonturama including The New World of the Gnomes, Mr. Bogus and Anatole (after week on the first block, Mi Tele with cartoon were ended in March 15) will be offer date premiered on March 23, 2002, until December 29, 2002.

On February 25, 2002, Telefutura acquired the rights to Zodiac Entertainment (via Carlton; which is previously cartoons are executive production in the UK), was the new block featured several first-run dubbed versions of original series from production by Zodiac and Calico (owned by World Events Productions, was the first-time previously aired on the originally Univision's block such as Voltron: Defender of the Universe and Denver, the Last Dinosaur), during the addition of the cartoon series and featured archived content from the programming library such as Mr. Bogus and Widget the World Watcher. On October 6, 2002, Telefutura was completely removed from the Madrid-based BRB Internacional's two cartoon series such as "The New World of the Gnomes" and "Super Models", ahead of the expiry of Telefutura's program supply deal with BRB Internacional for the passed ten-months, due to sale was brokered by Miami's Venevision International (now Cisneros Media). Venevision International's inked a two-year deal to rep BRB's catalog in North America and Latin America outside Mexico. The network was changed the schedule and replaced by two Nelvana cartoon series (including "Cadillacs and Dinosaurs" and "Tales from the Cryptkeeper") briefly which is premiered as rerun in the following week. However, Telefutura was caring over of the BRB Internacional-produced shows to the block offer next year.

In January 2003, Telefutura acquired the rights and plans to contract with North Hollywood-based Film Roman, and added its first time in nearly two-years of the former Univision children's cartoon program as part of the block, "¡De Cabeza!" three cartoon shows (the network previously aired the three Film Roman-produced series from 2000 to 2001, before it was moved to sister network Telefutura, now UniMás). Featuring based on Felix the Cat characters from the popular television animated series, The Twisted Tales of Felix the Cat. The second line-up cartoon starring Bruce Willis, a character voice from the series, Bruno the Kid, as well as based on the popular video game franchise series by Midway Games as Mortal Kombat: Defenders of the Realm.

In August 2003, Telefutura under the contract with HIT Entertainment in UK, Junior and EM.TV & Merchandising AG in Germany, premiered as a one-hour block for many of which came from the block as the preschool television series, Bob the Builder, Fairy Tale Police Department and Mummy Nanny. Later in next month, the block introduced animated cartoon program with entered into an agreement with Toadbag Productions, including the new popular children's animated series, Toad Patrol (also known in Spanish as "Patrulla de Sapitos"), was an exception to the dubbing as it needed to use an English dub to fix translation issues. The series was originally aired and it was almost exclusively carried for the animated series as ran from September 6, 2003, to March 11, 2012.

As of January 8, 2005, Telefutura removed from the Canada-based Nelvana shows (including "Ned's Newt", "The Dumb Bunnies" and Tales from the Cryptkeeper"), due to the network was changed the schedule listing update to being dropped from the lineup block. However, the rival network, Telemundo's children's block, "Telemundo Kids" added Jacob Two-Two has previously aired with its Spanish dub premiered on January 9, 2005, before Telemundo was under contract with Nelvana. "Jacob Two-Two" was the only carried over to the block's direct successor and transition to Telemundo's Qubo block ("Qubo en Telemundo"; along with NBC and Ion Television) debut on September 9, 2006, included a three-hour Saturday and Sunday morning block on the network in 90-minute blocks.

In September 2005, Telefutura added the four cartoon shows for each Saturday morning schedule was pulling and it was entered into an agreement with the Australian-based children's media production, Australian Children's Television Foundation line-up such as Li'l Elvis and the Truckstoppers and the one CINAR (now WildBrain) series, Flight Squad. In Sunday morning, including the popular Universal Cartoon Studios cartoon series, Problem Child, was based on the 1990 film by Universal Pictures and "Zipi y Zape". In 2007, Telefutura reached a deal with National Geographic, as of remain added with the brand nature television series, Really Wild Animals. It was the network changed the name, and renamed as "Toonturama Presenta: La Vida Animal" (in English, "Toonturama Present: Animal Life"), were the last "Toonturama" cartoon series to be added to the block on November 4, 2007.

The block aired for the final time and ended its run on September 30, 2012, without any announcement of its closure, and it was quietly replaced by the children's live-action documentary and nature series, while the network was carried of the preschool children's Spanish-language adaptation, Plaza Sésamo until 2016, when it was following week on October 7, 2012. As a result, Telefutura discontinued airing animated programming, making it the network not to air cartoon series within its children's program lineup. On September 9, 2018, in an agreement with Animaccord Animation Studio in Russia, the network launched the popular Russian cartoon Masha and the Bear, airing it every Sunday morning.

Toonturama Junior
The two-hour companion block that preceded it on Saturday and Sunday mornings within "Toonturama" sub-block, "Toonturama Junior", was launched on January 19, 2002. The sub-block was featuring programs aimed at preschoolers that fulfilled educational programming requirements defined by the Federal Communications Commission's Children's Television Act (the block aired with including originally distributors by Venevisión in Venezuela such as El Club de Los Tigritos, as well as Rugemania, and Televisa in Mexico including El Espacio de Tatiana and El Cubo de Donalú).

The sub-block was the preschool-age children like its competitors with Univision's sister-network, Galavisión's live-action preschool block, "Galamiguitos". Among the programs featured preschool children series on "Toonturama Junior" was Plaza Sésamo ("City Square Sesame"), Televisa and Sesame Workshop's Spanish-language adaptation of Sesame Street featuring a mix of original segments featuring characters based on its U.S.-based parent series and dubbed interstitials from the aforementioned originating program, which had aired on Univision since 1995 (ahead to the original "Planeta U" block since 2001 to 2003) after a seven-year run and passed on the U.S. television rights to Telefutura at its launch.

Programming

Scheduling variances and pre-emptions
All of the programs aired within the block featured content compliant with educational programming requirements as mandated by the Children's Television Act. Though the block was intended to air on weekday mornings and Saturday and Sunday mornings, some UniMás affiliates deferred certain programs aired within the block to Saturday and Sunday afternoons, including tape delayed the entire block in order to accommodate local weekend morning newscasts, "Miami Ahora" (which is simulcast of the Univision's owned-and-operated, WLTV-23 in Fort Lauderdale/Miami) or other programs of local interest (for example, then-affiliate KTFQ in Albuquerque, New Mexico, – now owned-and-operated by Entravision – aired the Toonturama block from  timeslot at 9:00 a.m. to 1:00 p.m.) Monday to Friday afternoons due to select national sports broadcasts (especially in the case of 2002 FIFA World Cup and/or 2006 FIFA World Cup soccer tournaments) or the network airing with the consisted of feature films including all of the Hollywood movies earlier attempt daytime or all of the animated holiday movies produced by Warner Bros. (via Warner Bros. Animation, DC Comics and Hanna-Barbera) and MGM scheduled in earlier timeslots to comply with the E/I regulations. Alleviating stations carrying UniMás network programming via that feed from the responsibility of purchasing the local rights to such as paid programs.

† - Indicates that the program ran on Univision prior to the block/program moved to "Toonturama" block within Saturday and Sunday mornings.
‡ - Indicates that the original Univision's "¡De Cabeza!" block program moved to Telefutura for its series premieres.

Current programming

Former programming

Acquired programming

Animated movies programming

Notes

See also 
 Planeta U - The weekend morning children's block on Univision.
 Galamiguitos - The preschool block on Galavisión.
 Univision y Los Niños - The Monday to Friday and Saturday morning block on Univision from 1989 to 1990.
 La Piñata Loca - The host of George Ortuzar from Saturday and Sunday morning block on Univision from 1996 to 2000.

References

External links
 

UniMás original programming
Television programming blocks in the United States
2002 American television series debuts